The Model 60 stacking stool is a wooden stool designed by Finnish designer Alvar Aalto in 1933. Manufactured by Artek, the stool is one of Aalto's most famous furniture designs.

History 

In the early 1930s Aalto undertook a series of experiments in the bending of wood, which ultimately culminated with his development of a bent wooden chair leg that could be manufactured en masse and did not require joinery. Aalto used the chair leg, named the "L leg" in his 1933 design for the model 60 stool, which was intended for use in the Vyborg Library. Aalto notoriously tested the durability of his design by repeatedly throwing a prototype of the stool against the ground.

The design was first presented to the public in November 1933 at a Finnish design exhibition titled Wood Only at Fortnum & Mason in London. The stool has been in continuous production since its initial release in 1933.

A 1933 model of the stool was added to the permanent collection of MoMA in 1958.

Later editions 
In 2017 streetwear brand Supreme released a limited edition version of the stool featuring a checkerboard pattern and red logo on the seat.

References 

Alvar Aalto
Individual pieces of furniture
Products introduced in 1933